Voskevaz is a village in the Ashtarak Municipality of the Aragatsotn Province of Armenia. Not far from the center of the village is the church of Surp Hovhannes, built between the 7th and 12th centuries. The village is home to the Hayasy brewery.

References 

World Gazetteer: Armenia – World-Gazetteer.com
Report of the results of the 2001 Armenian Census

Populated places in Aragatsotn Province
Erivan Governorate